The Five Fox Festival in Japan (stylized as THE FIVE FOX FESTIVAL in JAPAN) was a Japanese concert tour by Japanese band Babymetal. The tour ran from July 18, 2017 to October 15, 2017, taking place in Japan, and commenced after the band served a series of opening acts for various bands from 2016 to 2017.

Background 
After the conclusion of the Babymetal World Tour 2016: Legend Metal Resistance, the band supported Red Hot Chili Peppers, Metallica, Guns N' Roses, and Korn on their world tours as an opening act for several of their shows. On June 16, 2017, the band performed in a standalone headlining show in Los Angeles, to an audience of 4,000 people at The Palladium, where they debuted the live performance of the international exclusive song "From Dusk Till Dawn".

The tour has been subtitled in the band's lore as Metal Resistance Episode V. The first tour dates were announced on April 2, 2017 with shows subtitled Black Fox Festival, Red Fox Festival, Gold Fox Festival, Silver Fox Festival, and White Fox Festival, each with their requirements for attendance. Tickets were made available for pre-sale to "The One" members on April 1, 2017 and to Japanese audiences April 12, 2017. For international audiences, they were given out in a lottery from April 29 to May 9, 2017. On May 29, 2017, in response to tickets for the tour selling out, the band confirmed another leg, titled Big Fox Festival in Japan (stylized as BIG FOX FESTIVAL in JAPAN), adding four more shows. Tickets were made available to international audiences for presale on July 20, 2017, and via lottery on July 28, 2017 (with winners announced the following day).

The first performances of the tour running from July 18 to July 20, 2017 were located at Akasaka Blitz, the same venue where Legend "D" was held over four years ago. During the tour, the band also took part in Summer Sonic Festival in Osaka and Tokyo on August 19 and 20, respectively.

When asked for the reason for starting the tour, Su-metal explained that they set those events in music clubs to be able to see their fans up close, and Moametal said that she had wanted to perform in front of different audiences.

The Big Fox Festival October 15, 2017 was the last show of the tour. It was also the last of couple of others. As it was the last time the Real Kami band was allowed to do solo intros (Last one being performed before the song "Yava"). A couple of years later, the "economy version" Kami band (overseas fill ins) did a token intro for the song "Kagarou". Mainly, this show was the last time that Yui performed with Babymetal. It would not be until almost exactly a year later they would announce her departure. Yui has never been seen in public since.

Controversy 
According to the band, anyone who was unable to meet the requirements for attendance would be refused admittance to the show. The restrictions received a mixed response, with some considering it a potential innovation for concert tours in the future, or fascinating due to a potential culture gap. Others, particularly international audiences who won tickets via lottery, complained that it was unfair to be barred from shows due to not being in the correct age range. Fans have also found the age range set for the Silver Fox Festival, specifically for elementary school students and adults above the age of sixty, unusual.

Broadcast and recording 
The shows on October 14 and October 15, 2017 were recorded and set to stream via Wowow on April 14, 2018. Five shows from The Five Fox Festival in Japan and one from Big Fox Festival in Japan have been recorded and released as "The One" fanclub-exclusive box sets in early 2018.

Set list 
This setlist is representative of the show on August 30, 2017 in Osaka, Japan at Zepp Osaka Bayside. It does not represent all dates throughout the tour.
 "Babymetal Death"
 "Meta Taro" 
 "Catch Me If You Can"
 "Amore" 
 "GJ!"
 "Syncopation" 
 "Megitsune" 
 "Gimme Chocolate!!" 
 "Ijime, Dame, Zettai" 
 "Road of Resistance"

Tour dates

Video releases 

Footage from the tour has been released in two limited-quantity releases exclusively for "The One" fanclub members. The Chosen 500 released on January 20, 2018, and The Fox Festivals in Japan 2017: The Five Fox Festival & Big Fox Festival was released on February 14, 2018.

Background 
The Chosen 500 was announced on September 22, 2017, and released exclusively to a select five hundred "The One" fanclub members on January 20, 2018.
The set included footage from the first five shows of The Five Fox Festival in Japan as well as a set of colored fox masks.

The Fox Festivals in Japan 2017: The Five Fox Festival & Big Fox Festival was first announced on December 24, 2017, with shipment beginning in February 2018. The set included footage from The Five Fox Festival in Japan (the same shows included with The Chosen 500), as well as the final show from Big Fox Festival in Japan.

Track listings 
The Chosen 500 includes only the first five discs as a DVD box set, while The Fox Festivals in Japan 2017: The Five Fox Festival & Big Fox Festival includes all six discs as a Blu-ray box set.

Notes

References

External links
 Official Babymetal website

2017 concert tours
Babymetal concert tours
Concert tours of Asia
Concert tours of Japan